Professor Richard Higgott was born in 1949 in Nottingham, UK.  He is based in the Brussels School of Governance, the Vrije Universiteit Brussel where he is Distinguished Professor of Diplomacy. From 2020 he has been a Visiting Professor in the Department of Social, Political and Cognitive Sciences at the University of Siena in Italy. 

He is an elected Fellow of the UK Academy of Social Sciences.

Professor Higgott is a former Fulbright Fellow at the Kennedy School of Government. He has been National Director of the Australian Institute of International Affairs and Vice President of the USA International Studies Association.  He was also, for 1989–90, the president of the Australasian Political Studies Association.

Other academic appointments include the University of Manchester (professor of Government); the Research School of Pacific and Asian Studies, Australian National University (Professor in International Relations and Public Policy and Director of Studies for the Australian Department of Foreign Affairs and Trade) as well as at the University of Western of Australia. Sub-professorial career positions include those at the Kennedy School of Government, Harvard University, the  University of Tasmania and the University of Western Australia.

In June 2011, Higgott took up the position of Vice-Chancellor, the chief officer, of Murdoch University in Western Australia. He was appointed with a mandate to reform the institution, raise standards, improve the university research reputation and international standing. During his time in office there was a significant improvement in Murdoch University's rankings; notably it rose in the ‘Worlds Top 100 universities under 50’ debuting high at 57th in 2013. 

During the reform process to either promote or attract word class researchers, he was accused in anonymous letters that he had appointed a professor to a senior university position who was a former colleague of his.  He resigned in October 2014 during the preparation of a Corruption and Crime Commission Report on the university.  On 1 July 2016, the Australian Broadcasting Corporation News (ABC News) reported that a WA Government report formed an opinion of misconduct against former Murdoch University vice chancellor Richard Higgott. Whilst the CCC Report acknowledged that Professor Higgott had informed both the university selection committee and the deputy Chancellor of his prior professional relationship in a cross national research project and as co-authors of academic publications, the perception was that Professor Higgott sought to have this person appointed to a senior university post  The candidate was deemed by the university selection committee to be the best candidate for the position.  The WA Corruption and Crime Commission noted that Higgott had appointed another former colleague, Mr Jon Baldwin previously Registrar of Warwick University. The Report also found that Higgott had breached Murdoch University's code of conduct by using a university laptop to access adult material online. The Commission Report resulted in neither sanction nor legal proceedings. 

However, the CCC investigation highlighted that problems lay with other actors in the University, such as failed oversight, including specifically "a Senate (that) fails to effectively articulate the parameters within which a Vice-Chancellor should act". The national business media suggested that the newly appointed Chancellor, David Flanagan (a miner), was "more local and closer to the parochial sentiments of Perth" and ill-suited to the pursuit of international talent and high educational standards.  An opinion article in The Australian depicted Professor Higgott as a ‘A Colleague who Cared’ and portrayed the investigation as a consequence of "bossy neoliberal governments" where "scholarly freedom is jeopardised".

Full Corruption Commission report on the matter including details of how between 10 January 2012 and 9 September 2014, Professor Higgott accessed 486 adult rated files during both work and non-work time on his work laptop, then attempted to delete evidence using (unsuccessfully) Hard Drive Scrubbing Software.  Murdoch's policies for its use which prohibited access to adult material. Professor Higgott directly breached Murdoch's IT usage policies as he had done with Murdoch's Code of Conduct and recruitment policies, and it was contrary to his contract of employment.

References

British political scientists
Living people
Year of birth missing (living people)
Place of birth missing (living people)
Fellows of the Academy of Social Sciences